The ladies' 10 kilometre cross-country race at the 1956 Winter Olympics was held on 28 January. Thirty-seven competitors from eleven countries participated in the event. The Soviet Union won the top two spots when Lyubov Kozyreva edged teammate Radya Yeroshina by 5 seconds. Swede Sonja Edström won the bronze.

Medalists

Source:

Results

* - Difference is in minutes and seconds.

Source:

See also

 1956 Winter Olympics

References

Sources
 

Women's cross-country skiing at the 1956 Winter Olympics
Women's 10 kilometre cross-country skiing at the Winter Olympics
Cross
Oly